Burhan Imad Shah, was an infant ruler of Berar. He gained the throne at the age of three, and is known to have been one of the belligerents at the Battle of Talikota but was later overthrown by Tufail Khan. Shortly after the death of Tufail Khan, the Berar Sultanate came to an end and Berar was captured by the Ahmednagar Sultanate. The capital city of the sultanate, Amravati, came under direct control of the sultanate of Ahmednagar.

See also
Deccan sultanates

References

Imad Shahi dynasty
Sultans